Ysgol Gyfun Llangefni is a bilingual community comprehensive school for pupils aged 11 to 18 years old located in Llangefni, Anglesey. Pupils come from the town of Llangefni and the surrounding villages and rural areas. The school opened around 1953 and currently has 700+ students on roll.

There is a leisure centre neighbouring the school called Plas Arthur.

School houses
The school's four houses annually compete in the school sports day and school Eisteddfod.

School catchment area
The school serves a central area of Anglesey that includes Bodorgan, Bodffordd, Gaerwen, Llanbedrgoch, Llangefni, Llangristiolus, Talwrn and Dwyran.

The following is a list of primary schools that fall within the boundary of Ysgol Gyfun Llangefni's catchment area. 

 Ysgol Gymuned Bodffordd
 Ysgol Esceifiog (Gaerwen)
 Ysgol Gynradd Llanbedrgoch
 Ysgol y Graig, Llangefni
 Ysgol Henblas
 Ysgol Talwrn
 Ysgol Corn Hir, Llangefni
 Santes Dwynwen

Notable alumni
 Naomi Watts - Hollywood actress and Oscar nominee 
 Gwyn Hughes Jones - Opera Tenor 
 Gabriel Fielding - English novelist 
 Wilfred Mitford Davies - Welsh artist and publisher

Notable staff members

 Sonia Edwards - Bilingual novelist, taught Welsh at the school.
 Gerald Morgan - Historian and Welsh author,  served as headteacher from 1966 until 1973.

Welsh language 
Welsh Government defines the school as a bilingual secondary school Category 2B, which means that, at least 80% of subjects (excluding Welsh and English) are taught through the medium of Welsh but are also taught through the medium of English. However, the majority are taught through the medium of Welsh. Approximately 87% of pupils study Welsh as a first language.

As of January 2018, 70.4% of the school's pupils spoke Welsh at home.

See also
:Category:People educated at Ysgol Gyfun Llangefni

References

Secondary schools in Anglesey
Educational institutions established in 1953
Llangefni
1953 establishments in Wales